Halmyris  was a Roman and Byzantine fort, settlement and naval port, located 2.5 kilometers west of the village of Murighiol at the mouth of the Danube Delta in Romania. It is locally known as the site where the bodies of two Christian saints, Epictet and Astion, were uncovered between 2001 and 2004.

History of the Site

Despite the creation of several Greek colonies along the Romanian Black Sea coast during the 7th century BC, no corresponding Greek structural remains have been found nearby Halmyris. The region was inhabited during the Second Iron Age by the Getae or Dacians as is evident by the discovery of several cremation burials within a possible necropolis that dates to the 4th-2nd centuries BC. 
While the first Roman occupation of the site seems to have been in the form of a turf-and-timber fort constructed during the Flavian period, the first stone castrum at Halmyris was built during the reign of the emperor Trajan.  Although the original layout of the Trajanic fort is largely covered by later reconstructive phases, the plan seems to have been indicative of the 'typical' 2nd century layout of a Roman fort, composed of a rectangular defensive wall, rectangular towers and a gate in the middle of each of the walls.  The placement of the fort was strategically deliberate as it lay not only along the course of the Danube River but also at the very mouth of the Black Sea.  Early connections to the Roman fleet and its maritime activities at Halmyris are confirmed from epigraphic evidence mentioning the existence of a 'mariner's village' or vicus classicorum.
However, a significant alteration of the defenses took place during the Tetrarchy period.  The new layout of the fort walls consisted of an irregular polygon bolstered by 15 towers and at least two well-defended gateways in the north and the west. Structures found within the fort include numerous barracks, a private thermae or bathhouse and  a basilica.  However, in the winter of 384/5, the Danube froze, allowing the foreign tribes to the north to cross and sack Halmyris.  A series of earthquakes in the 4th century and later that altered the course of the Danube led to the silting up of Halmyris' harbor and decreased its economic and strategic importance.  The final period of occupation seems to correspond with the reconstruction of the fort by the emperor Justinian.  Additionally, Halmyris became the site of one of the major bishoprics in the province as well as being named as one of the fifteen most important towns in the province of Scythia.

Halmyris was the most easterly point of the Danubian border in Roman times and probably served as a supply centre for the fleet; early Roman inscriptions inform us of the existence of a "mariner's village"—vicus classicorum. During the late Roman period two units of the military fleet—Classis in Plateypegiis and Musculi Schytici (which had little ships, suited for the Danube Delta) may have been hosted by this city.

As for religious life, we know that in 290 AD, during the persecutions ordered by Diocletian, Saint Epictetus and Astion suffered martyrdom at Halmyris.

 Halmyris served as a depot for supplies, colonization and cultural exchange in the region for 1,100 years. It was occupied from the Iron Age to the Byzantine period.
 The original fort was made of timber and turf, but as the fort gained importance and a regular garrison was established along the Danube, the fort was rebuilt in stone.
 Early in the fort's history, the Goths and Huns from the North crossed the Danube and conquered the fort. It was later re-captured by the Romans.
 In the early 4th century, the Emperor Constantine added a basilica.
 A series of earthquakes altered the course of the Danube and the fort became more removed from the river. Halmyris gradually lost its importance and was abandoned.

Current activities
 The fort was excavated by the late Prof. Mihail Zahariade and Dr. John Karavas, with the Archaeology at Halmyris international volunteer program from 2010-2019.

See also
 Histria
 List of ancient towns in Scythia Minor
 List of castra
 Peuce Island

References

 The Archeological Museum, Tulcea, Romania

External links
 http://www.halmyris.org/

Roman archaeology
Public archaeology
Roman sites in Romania
Roman towns and cities in Romania
Archaeological sites in Romania
Ruins in Romania
History of Dobruja
Greek colonies in Scythia Minor
Former populated places in Eastern Europe
Byzantine sites in Romania
Byzantine forts
Roman legionary fortresses in Romania
Historic monuments in Tulcea County